Hoskins Rural LLG is a local-level government (LLG) of West New Britain Province, Papua New Guinea.

Wards
01. Garua
02. Kwalakesi
03. Hoskins
04. Kalu
05. Valoka
06. Rikau/Siki
07. Kagagu
08. Malala
09. Pokili

References

Local-level governments of West New Britain Province